Ihor Chaykovskyi (born 7 October 1991) is a Ukrainian professional footballer who plays as a midfielder.

Club career
Chaykovskyi began his playing career with FC Bukovyna Chernivtsi and FC Shakhtar Donetsk's youth teams. He made his first team debut in the Premier League in Zorya Luhansk in a match against FC Dnipro Dnipropetrovsk on 28 February 2010.

On 19 June 2017, he signed with the Russian club FC Anzhi Makhachkala.

On 22 January 2019, FC Zorya Luhansk announced his return to the club on a 2.5-year contract.

Honours 
2009 UEFA European Under-19 Football Championship: Champion

Career statistics

Club

References

External links
Profile at Football.ua site 
Profile at Official FFU site 

FC Shakhtar Donetsk players
1991 births
Living people
Ukrainian footballers
Association football midfielders
Ukrainian Premier League players
FC Zorya Luhansk players
FC Mariupol players
Ukraine under-21 international footballers
Ukraine youth international footballers
FC Anzhi Makhachkala players
Ukrainian expatriate footballers
Expatriate footballers in Russia
Ukrainian expatriate sportspeople in Russia
Russian Premier League players
FC Inhulets Petrove players
Sportspeople from Chernivtsi